The Lego Batman Movie was a product line based on The Lego Batman Movie, the second film of The Lego Movie franchise. It is licensed from The Lego Group, DC Comics and Warner Bros. Animation. The theme was first introduced in 2017 as part of a licensing and merchandising programme associated with the film. Alongside the release of the Lego sets, the programme included the release of several promotional short films and The Lego Batman Movie Game app. The product line was discontinued by the end of 2018.

Overview

On 10 February 2017, The Lego Batman Movie was released by Warner Bros. Pictures. The storyline follows the DC Comics character Batman, voiced by Will Arnett, who attempts to overcome his greatest fear to stop the Joker's latest plan. To promote the film, The Lego Group released a collection of Lego construction sets and a set of collectible Lego minifigures, which were based on the characters and locations in the film. A range of other merchandise and media was produced as part of the marketing programme, including a number of books published by DK Publishing, Scholastic, Ameet and Blue Ocean. With more than 21 books, the robust movie tie-in program encompasses storybooks, readers, activity books, sticker books, magazines, junior novel, guide books and The Making of The Lego Batman Movie behind-the-scenes film guide, the first-ever making-of book for the franchise.

In 2016, The Lego Group built a life-sized model of The Batman who appear in The Lego Batman Movie film.  The Batman contained a total of 53,998 Lego bricks, and weighed 286 pounds. They were placed in front of San Diego Comic Con. In 2017, The Lego Group built a life-sized model of The Batmobile based on The Lego Batman Movie film.  The Batmobile contained a total of 300,000 Lego bricks, and weighed 1,700 pounds. They were placed in front of Detroit Auto Show.

Development
During the development process of The Lego Batman Movie theme, producer Dan Lin explained its concept. Dan Lin explained, "The themes are constantly refined with these LEGO movies, we start with multiple themes, so many different ideas and then we have to slowly strip it away. The question of can Batman be happy, that was where we started in first place – myself, Phil Lord and Chris Miller from the first movie, and Chris McKay. We said, ‘okay, now we’ve had phenomenal success with the first movie, what story do we tell?’" and continued, "At first we thought it was going to be The LEGO Movie Sequel, and then we put that aside. Let’s tell a few more stories before we get to that, attack a few more genres. Then when we decided that Batman was going be next we started thinking about what’s in the Batman lore that hasn’t been explored before. There’s obviously been lots of different versions on television and movies and we keyed on can Batman be happy? That’s a theme we can actually explore in a LEGO movie way, so we ran forward from there."

Dan Lin also discussed about the different franchises and explained, "We got every franchise that we wanted, except for one – and if you watch the movie closely you’ll probably guess which one we didn’t get. But it was a lot easier than the first movie, when people didn’t know what a LEGO movie was. This was the second time around for some of these franchise rights holders, whether that’s J K Rowling or the Saul Zaentz estate, they had worked with us before and had very good experience. We brought in some new franchises, such as the Daleks from Doctor Who, but it was a lot easier because they saw what we were trying to do with the first movie. We’re trying to tell the LEGO versions of the characters, so we’re not doing the exact Daleks from Doctor Who, we’re doing the LEGO version of them. When they see that, and they understand the comedy in that, it makes it a lot easier."

Characters

 Batman: A billionaire, vigilante superhero from Gotham City.
 The Joker: Batman's archenemy who is also known as the "Clown Prince of Crime".
 Robin: An orphan who is adopted by Bruce Wayne, and becomes a sidekick to Batman.
 Barbara Gordon: A police officer who becomes the new police commissioner.
 Alfred Pennyworth: The family butler of the Wayne family, and friend to Bruce Wayne.  
 Harley Quinn: The Joker's girlfriend and accomplice, and fellow-criminal in Gotham City. 
 Commissioner James Gordon: The commissioner of the Gotham City Police Department, and ally to Batman. 
 Chief O'Hara: the Gotham City Police Department's chief of police. 
 Mayor McCaskill: The mayor of Gotham City.
 Two-Face: A disfigured lawyer once allied with Batman,  who became a villain following his criminal downfall. 
 Pamela Isley / Poison Ivy: A villain in Gotham city, who has powers to control flora lifeforms.  
 Wicked Witch of the West: an evil witch from the Land of Oz who is imprisoned in the Phantom Zone. 
 Edward Nygma / Riddler: A riddle-obsessed criminal from Gotham City. 
 Jonathan Crane / Scarecrow: A criminally insane former doctor, who uses fear gas to manipulate the people of Gotham City.
 Selina Kyle / Catwoman: An expert burglar, vigilante anti-hero and criminal from Gotham City.
 Clayface: A villainous criminal from Gotham City, with the metahuman ability of shapeshifting. 
 Bane: A criminal genius who uses a drug called "Venom" to gain superhuman strength. Benson satirizes Tom Hardy's performance in The Dark Knight Rises. 
 Victor Fries/ Mr. Freeze: A doctor and scientist from Gotham City, who turns to villainy following the death of his wife. Fries wears a cryogenic suit that grants him superhuman abilities and uses a freeze gun. 
 Killer Croc: An animalistic, metahuman villain from Gotham City. 
 Penguin: A rich and powerful crime lord from Gotham City, who uses trick-umbrellas and robotic penguins. 
 Superman: A superhero with various superpowers, from the planet Krypton, and member of the Justice League who defends Earth and lives in Metropolis.

Toy line

Construction Sets
According to Bricklink, The Lego Group released a total of 42 Lego sets and promotional polybags as part of The Lego Batman Movie theme. It was discontinued by the end of 2019.

In July 2016, The Lego Group had a partnership with Warner Bros. Animation and DC Comics. The Lego Group had announced that the first wave sets that based on The Lego Batman Movie film would be released on 10 February 2017. The 13 sets being released were The Joker Balloon Escape (set number: 70900), Mr. Freeze Ice Attack (set number: 70901), Catwoman Catcycle Chase (set number: 70902), The Riddler Riddle Racer (set number: 70903), Clayface Splat Attack (set number: 70904), The Batmobile (set number: 70905), The Joker Notorious Lowrider (set number: 70906), Killer Croc Tail-Gator (set number: 70907), The Scuttler (set number: 70908), Batcave Break-In (set number: 70909), Scarecrow Special Delivery (set number: 70910), The Penguin Arctic Roller (set number: 70911) and Arkham Asylum (set number: 70912). In addition, the 7 polybag sets have been released as a promotions are The Mini Batmobile (set number: 30521), Batman in the Phantom Zone (set number: 30522), The Joker Battle Training (set number: 30523), The Mini Batwing (set number: 30524), Disco Batman - Tears of Batman (set number: 30607) and Batgirl (set number: 30612). Also included 6 key chains with a key chain attached to the minifigures of Batman, The Joker, Robin, Catwoman, Harley Quinn and Kiss Kiss Tuxedo Batman. Each of the sets features four core characters, named Batman, Alfred, Robin and Batgirl.

Later, the second wave sets would be released on 2 June 2017. The 5 sets being released were Scarecrow Fearful Face-off (set number: 70913), Bane Toxic Truck Attack (set number: 70914), Two-Face Double Demolition (set number: 70915), The Batwing (set number: 70916) and The Ultimate Batmobile (set number: 70917). In October 2017, The Lego Batman Movie Minifigure Collection (set number: 5004939) is an exclusive promo set only available in Toys "R" Us stores or online shop.

In 2018, the third wave sets would be released on 1 January 2018. The 6 sets being released were The Bat-Dune Buggy (set number: 70918), The Justice League Anniversary Party (set number: 70919), Egghead Mech Food Fight (set number: 70920), Harley Quinn Cannonball Attack (set number: 70921), The Joker Manor (set number: 70922) and The Bat-Space Shuttle (set number: 70923). In additional, The Mini Ultimate Batmobile (set number: 30526) and Bat Shooter (set number: 40301) polybag sets have been released as promotions.

Collectible minifigures
The Lego Batman Movie Series 1 (set number: 71017) would be released on 1 January 2017 as a part of the Lego Minifigures theme. It consists of 20 characters instead of the usual 16.

The Lego Batman Movie Series 2 (set number: 71020) would be released around the world on 1 January 2018 as a part of the Lego Minifigures theme. It consists of 20 characters instead of the usual 16.

Lego BrickHeadz sets
Several The Lego Batman Movie characters have also been released as part of the Lego BrickHeadz theme. A range of The Lego Batman Movie BrickHeadz was announced on 1 March 2017, which included Batman, Batgirl, Robin and The Joker as buildable characters.

Film

The Lego Batman Movie (2017)

In October 2014, Warner Bros. scheduled the release of The Lego Batman Movie, a spin-off starring Batman, for 2017, moving the release date for The Lego Movie 2 (later titled as The Lego Movie 2: The Second Part) to 2018. Will Arnett returned to voice Batman, with Chris McKay, who was earlier attached to the sequel, directing the film, the story written by Seth Grahame-Smith, and the film produced by Dan Lin, Roy Lee, Phil Lord and Christopher Miller. On April 20, 2015, Warner Bros. scheduled The Lego Batman Movie for a February 10, 2017 release. In July 2015, Arnett's Arrested Development co-star Michael Cera was cast to voice Robin. In August 2015, Zach Galifianakis entered final negotiations to voice the Joker. In October 2015, Rosario Dawson was cast to voice Barbara Gordon, the daughter of police commissioner James Gordon who later becomes the crime-fighting heroine Batgirl. The following month, Ralph Fiennes was cast as Alfred Pennyworth, Bruce Wayne's butler. Mariah Carey, although initial reports indicated she was playing Commissioner Gordon, was actually cast as Mayor McCaskill. The first trailer for the film was released on March 24, 2016, followed by a second on March 28 the same year. The film was released in the United States on February 10, 2017.

The score was composed by Lorne Balfe.

Short films
Short films set within the franchise were produced. Most of which were released on the home media releases of the films. In addition, various other shorts made to promote the films and unrelated real world events have been released on YouTube.

Dark Hoser (2017)
Dark Hoser is a short film included on the home media release of The Lego Batman Movie. Batman attends a tryout to apply to be a member of the Justice League of America, but only finds out he might be Canadian.

Batman is Just Not That Into You (2017)
Batman is Just Not That Into You is a short film included on the home media release of The Lego Batman Movie. Harley Quinn hosts a talk show and helps The Joker break up with Batman.

Cooking with Alfred (2017)
Cooking with Alfred is a short film included on the home media release of The Lego Batman Movie. Within the episode, Alfred attempts to cook a meal, but when Batman reveals a mysterious creature called the Batmonkey has lived in Wayne Manor for ages. Alfred hosts a cooking show with Batman and Robin as his guest stars.

Movie Sound Effects: How Do They Do That? (2017)
Movie Sound Effects: How Do They Do That? is a short film included on the home media release of The Lego Batman Movie. Bane, The Riddler, Poison Ivy and Catwoman are brought into a sound booth to help record sound effects for The Lego Batman Movie. They all have problems: Bane's voice is too squeaky, Riddler turns everything into a riddle, Poison Ivy is too interested in plants, and Catwoman only speaks in meows. Eventually, Two-Face pops in and wrecks the recording.

Books
In 2017, two books based on The Lego Batman Movie theme was released. The Making of The Lego Batman Movie and The Lego Batman Movie Essential Guide were released on February 11, 2017, by DK.

Video game and app

Lego Dimensions (2015)

The crossover toys-to-life game Lego Dimensions developed by Traveller's Tales features content based on the original The Lego Movie and The Lego Batman Movie. A "Starter Pack" includes an additional level that recreates the events of the original film and adds Wyldstyle as a playable character. Additional "Fun packs" add Emmet, Benny, Bad Cop and Unikitty as playable characters. A "story pack" offers an extended six-level story campaign retelling the events of The Lego Batman Movie, and includes a playable Robin and Batgirl. In addition, "Fun packs" added Excalibur Batman as a playable character.

The Lego Batman Movie Game (2017)
An app titled The Lego Batman Movie Game was a Lego-themed endless-runner game that based on the same name of the film and developed by Warner Bros. Interactive Entertainment was released on 11 January 2017 alongside of the film. It was released for Android and iOS.

Reception 
In July 2018, The Scuttler (set number: 70908), Batcave Break-In (set number: 70909), The Ultimate Batmobile (set number: 70917) and The Bat-Space Shuttle (set number: 70923) was listed as "The 10 Best ‘Batman’ Lego Sets for Kids and Collectors" by official website Fatherly. In November 2018, the Toy Retailers Association listed The Lego Batman Movie Minifigure Series (set number: 71017) on its official list of 2018 Toy of the Year Awards.

See also 
The Lego Movie (franchise)
The Lego Movie
The Lego Movie (Lego theme)
The Lego Batman Movie
The Lego Ninjago Movie
The Lego Ninjago Movie (Lego theme)
The Lego Movie 2: The Second Part
Unikitty!
Lego Unikitty!
Lego Minifigures (theme)
Lego Batman
Lego Super Heroes
Lego Dimensions

References

External links
 Official website 

Batman Movie
Batman Movie
The Lego Movie (franchise)
Products introduced in 2017
DC Comics franchises
Batman toys
Products and services discontinued in 2019